Ismael Villegas Diaz (born August 12, 1976) is a former Major League Baseball pitcher.

Villegas was drafted by the Chicago Cubs in the fifth round of the 1995 Major League Baseball draft. In June 1996, the Cubs traded him to the Atlanta Braves for Tyler Houston.

Villegas was called up to the Major Leagues in July 2000 after Mike Remlinger suffered an injury and Don Wengert was designated for assignment. He made his Major League debut on July 3, 2000 at Turner Field in relief of Terry Mulholland. He would face 15 batters and get eight outs, allowing four earned runs to score. He twice faced future Hall of Famer Vlad Guerrero, first hitting him with a pitch and then getting him to ground out. A few days later he would be replaced on the roster by pitcher Scott Kamieniecki and would not pitch in the Major Leagues again.

Villegas signed with the Oakland Athletics following the 2001 season but, after posting an 8.46 earned run average with the Sacramento River Cats, he would finish the 2002 season as well as his career with the Atlantic City Surf of the independent Atlantic League.

References

External links

1976 births
Living people
Atlanta Braves players
Atlantic City Surf players
Danville Braves players
Durham Bulls players
Greenville Braves players
Gulf Coast Cubs players
Macon Braves players
Major League Baseball pitchers
Major League Baseball players from Puerto Rico
Mexican League baseball pitchers
People from Río Piedras, Puerto Rico
Piratas de Campeche players
Puerto Rican expatriate baseball players in Mexico
Richmond Braves players
Rockford Cubbies players
Sacramento River Cats players
Williamsport Cubs players